Horslunde is a village on the island of Lolland in south-eastern Denmark. In January 2022 its population was 610. Horslunde is now part of Lolland Municipality and belongs to Region Zealand.

Sites of interest in Horslunde include Reventlow-Museet Pederstrup and the town's three churches, Horslunde Church, Nøbbet Church, and Nordlunde Church.

Notable people 
 Christian Ditlev, Count of Reventlow (1710–1775) a Danish Privy Councillor, nobleman and estate owner; buried in Horslunde church
 Christian Ditlev Frederik, Count of Reventlow (1748–1827) a Danish statesman and reformer; buried in Horslunde church
 Juan Fugl (1811 in Horslunde – 1900) an early Danish immigrant to Tandil in Argentina
 Rasmus Friis (born 1871 in Horslunde - date of death unknown) a sports shooter, competed at the 1912 Summer Olympics

References

Cities and towns in Region Zealand
Lolland
Lolland Municipality